The Canon EOS 5000 (sold in Asian countries as the EOS 888) was an entry-level 35mm autofocus single-lens reflex camera marketed by Canon in January 1995. The camera was introduced as a low-end camera for the European market, and was not sold in Japan or the Americas.

Unlike most Canon EOS cameras, the EOS 5000 is primarily controlled by a single dial on the top of the camera. The camera offers five fully automatic exposure modes, as well as shutter-priority autoexposure. No manual aperture control is provided. 

Along with renamed versions for different markets, a QD version which could print the date or time the photograph was taken was available. It was replaced in the market by the EOS 3000 in 1999.

References 

1995 introductions
Canon EOS 35 mm cameras